Colombia is scheduled to compete at the 2023 Pan American Games in Santiago, Chile from October 20 to November 5, 2023. This will be Colombia's 19th appearance at the Pan American Games, having competed at every Games since the inaugural edition in 1951.

Competitors
The following is the list of number of competitors (per gender) participating at the games per sport/discipline.

Archery

Colombia qualified 10 archers during the 2022 Pan American Archery Championships.

Men

Women

Mixed

Artistic swimming

Colombia qualified a full team of nine artistic swimmers after winning silver medals in the 2022 South American Games.

Baseball

Colombia qualified a men's team (of 24 athletes) by winning the 2021 Junior Pan American Games.

Summary

Basketball

3x3

Women's tournament

Colombia qualified a women's team (of 4 athletes) by winning the 2021 Junior Pan American Games.
Summary

Bowling

Colombia qualified a full team of two men and two women through the 2022 South American Games held in Asuncion, Paraguay.

Boxing

Colombia qualified seven boxers (three men and four women) by reaching the final of the 2022 South American Games. Colombia qualified one male boxer by reaching the final of the 2021 Junior Pan American Games.

Men

Women

Canoeing

Sprint
Colombia qualified a total of 5 sprint athletes (three men and two women).

Men

Women

Cycling

BMX
Colombia qualified one male cyclist in BMX race after winning the event in the 2021 Junior Pan American Games and four cyclists (two men and two women) in BMX race through the UCI World Rankings.

Racing

Mountain
Colombia qualified one female cyclist in Mountain biking after winning the event in the 2021 Junior Pan American Games.

Road
Colombia qualified five cyclists in track and road after winning the respective events in the 2021 Junior Pan American Games.

Men

Women

Track
Colombia qualified a full team of 18 track cyclists (nine men and nine women) after winning the events in the 2022 South American Games.

Men

Sprint

Pursuit

Keirin

Madison

Omnium

Fencing

Colombia qualified a full team of 18 fencers (nine men and nine women), after all six teams finished at least in the top seven at the 2022 Pan American Fencing Championships in Ascuncion, Paraguay.

Individual
Men

Women

Team

Football

Men's tournament

Colombia qualified a men's team of 18 athletes by virtue of its campaign in the 2023 South American U-20 Championship.

Summary

Modern pentathlon

Colombia qualified two modern pentathletes (one man and one woman).

Rugby sevens

Women's tournament

Colombia qualified a women's team (of 12 athletes) by winning bronze medal in the Women's competition at the 2022 South American Games.

Summary

Sailing

Colombia has qualified 2 boats for a total of 3 sailors.

Men

Women

Shooting

Colombia qualified a total of seven shooters in the 2022 Americas Shooting Championships. Colombia also qualified one shooter during the 2022 South American Games.

Men
Pistol and rifle

Men
Shotgun

Women
Pistol and rifle

Squash

Colombia qualified a female team of 3 athletes through the 2022 South American Games.

Women

Surfing

Colombia qualified one female surfer.

Artistic

Taekwondo

Colombia has qualified a male athlete at a Kyorugi event, by virtue of his title in the 2021 Junior Pan American Games. 

Kyorugi

Men

Tennis

Colombia qualified one female athlete after reaching the final of the singles tournament in the 2022 South American Games.

Women

Volleyball

Indoor

Men's tournament

Colombia qualified a men's team (of 12 athletes) by finishing third in the CSV Qualifying Tournament.

Summary

Women's tournament

Colombia qualified a women's team (of 12 athletes) by finishing second in the CSV Qualifying Tournament.

Summary

Water skiing

Colombia qualified two wakeboarders (one of each gender) during the 2022 Pan American Championship.

Colombia also qualified four water skiers during the 2022 Pan American Water skiing Championship.

Men

Women

Wakeboard
Men

Women

Wrestling

Colombia qualified four wrestlers (Men's Freestyle: 57 kg and 86 kg), (Greco-Roman: 67 kg and 87 kg),through the 2022 Pan American Wrestling Championships held in Acapulco, Mexico. Colombia also qualified two wrestlers (Greco-Roman: 60 kg), (Women's Freestyle: 68 kg) by winning the 2021 Junior Pan American Games.

Men

Women

See also
Colombia at the 2024 Summer Olympics

References

Nations at the 2023 Pan American Games
2023
2023 in Colombian sport